Jialishan Range is a mountain range in northern Taiwan. It is also regarded as the northern part of "Western Thrust Fault Mountains" by Tomita Yoshirou and Lin Chaoqi.

Although it is named as "Range", some scholars think it only is a piedmont belt. It does not find a mention in the geography textbooks of elementary schools and high schools. The reason is Jialishan Range was cut by several rivers.

The tallest peak of Jialishan Range is Mount Le, which has a height of 2,618 m.

Location 
Jialishan Range faces the Xueshan Range on the east and Alishan Range on the south.

Including 

 Shen'ao Mountains
 Sandiouling Mountains
 Nangang Range
 Fushishan Range
 Wuzhishan Range
 Dajianshan Range
 Wanli Mountains
 Shanzijiou Block
 Qingshukeng Block
 Daxi Mountains
 Xiongkongshan Range
 Youloushan Range
 Leshan Range
 Shitoushan Mointains
 Baguali Range
 Malabang Range
 Bajioudong Range
 Guandaoshan Range
 Dahu Hills
 Dongshi Hills
 Fengyuan Hills
 Chuyunshan Range
 Dahengpingshan Range
 Nantou Hills
 Jijidashan Range

References

External links

Mountain ranges of Taiwan